The Nipissing-North Arm Orienteering Trail, a  backpacking route, leads across rugged wilderness in the Massasauga Provincial Park, Ontario, Canada.  The park is situated along Georgian Bay on Lake Huron and its trails are accessible only by water.  The trail is not blazed, although there are posts with interpretive information located at points of interest along the route.

Further reading
 Ontario Parks, Nipissing-North Arm Orienteering Trail Guide, draft
 Ontario Parks, The Massasauga Provincial Park Map, Queen's Printer for Ontario, Toronto, 2009,

References

External links
 Ontario Provincial Parks: Massasauga

Hiking trails in Ontario
Parks in Parry Sound District